Chencha is a woreda in Southern Nations, Nationalities, and Peoples' Region, Ethiopia. Part of the Gamo Zone, Chencha is bordered on the south by Arba Minch Zuria, on the west by Dita,&Gofa on the north by Kucha and Boreda, and on the east by Mirab Abaya. Towns in Chencha include Chencha, Dorze, Dokko and Ezo.

According to a 2004 report, Chencha had 36 kilometers of all-weather roads and 1 kilometer of dry-weather roads, for an average road density of 101 kilometers per 1000 square kilometers.

Demographics 
Based on the 2007 Census conducted by the CSA, this woreda has a total population of 111,686, of whom 51,310 are men and 60,376 women; 13,304 or 11.91% of its population are urban dwellers. The majority of the inhabitants practiced Ethiopian Orthodox Christianity, with 62.19% of the population reporting that belief, and 36.82% were Protestants.

The 1994 national census reported a total population for this woreda of 88,040 of whom 38,750 were men and 49,290 were women; 7,851 or 8.92% of its population were urban dwellers. The largest ethnic group reported in Chencha was the Gamo people (98.7%); all other ethnic groups made up 1.3% of the population. Gamo was spoken as a first language by 95.89%, 1.88% Amharic, and 1.85% spoke Dorze; the remaining 1.4% spoke all other primary languages reported. While performing fieldwork in 1991, Alemayehu Abebe reports that he found 14 kebeles in Chencha inhabited by the Dorze people.

Notes 

Districts of the Southern Nations, Nationalities, and Peoples' Region